The Council of Advisors on Digital Economy (abbreviated BJDW) is an advisory board to the German government established within the Federal Ministry for Economic Affairs and Energy of the Federal Republic of Germany. It was created in 2013 to advise on strategic decisions related to the digital economy and digital transformations.  The council meets in non-public sessions and is directly reporting to the federal government: the current minister responsible is Peter Altmaier serving on the cabinet of Federal Chancellor Angela Merkel as her Federal Minister of Economic Affairs and Energy.

Members 

The council members, distinguished individuals appointed by the German government, are drawn from industry, research institutions, and NGOs qualified on the basis of achievement, experience, and integrity. The advisory board includes leading representatives of the German digital economy. The members are not paid.

List of members 
The council currently comprises (as of 8/2020) the following 29 individuals.

 Anne Kjær Bathel, ReDI School of Digital Integration gGmb, Co-Founder and CEO
 Lina Behrens, Flying Health, CEO
 Jörg Bienert, Aiso-lab GmbH, Founder and CEO
 Lea-Sophie Cramer, Investor
 Eckart Diepenhorst, Free Now, CEO Europe
 Dr. Alexander von Frankenberg, High-Tech Gründerfonds Management GmbH, CEO
 Dr. Julia Freudenberg, Hacker School, CEO
 Christoph Gerlinger, German Startups Group GmbH & Co. KGaA, CEO
 Lisa Gradow, Investor
 Dr. Oliver Grün, Grün Software|GRÜN Software AG, CEO; Bundesverband IT-Mittelstand President
 Dr. Ute Günther, Business Angels Netzwerk Deutschland e.V. (BAND), CEO
 Finn Age Hänsel, SanityGroup GmbH, Founder and MD
 Dr. Fabian Heilemann, Earlybird Venture Capital Management GmbH & Co. KG, Partner
 Ulrike Hinrichs, Bundesverband Deutscher Kapitalbeteiligungsgesellschaften, CEO
 Anna Kaiser, Tandemploy GmbH, Founder and CEO
 Dr. Tom Kirschbaum, Door2Door GmbH, Founder and MD
 Dr. Tina Klüwer, Parlamind GmbH, CEO
 Prof. Dr. Dominik L. Michels, KAUST, Faculty
 Dr. Gesa Miczaika, Auxxo Beteiligungen GmbH, Founder
 Lena Sophie Müller, Initiative D21, CEO
 Judith Muttersbach-Dada, La Famiglia GmbH, CEO
 Florian Nöll, Bundesverband Deutsche Startups e.V., CEO
 Bastian Nominacher, Celonis SE, Co-Founder and Co-CEO
 Maria Piechnick, Wandelbots GmbH, Co-Founder and CPO
 Johannes Reck, GetYourGuide Deutschland GmbH, Co-Founder and CEO
 Stephanie Renda, Bundesverband Deutsche Startups e.V., CEO
 André Schwämmlein, FlixMobility GmbH (FlixBus), Founder and CEO
 Miriam Wohlfarth, Ratepay GmbH, Founder and MD
 Christian Vollmann, Good Hood GmbH, CEO

See also 
 Council of Economic Advisers
 President's Management Advisory Board
 Strategic and Policy Forum

References 

Federal Government of Germany
Economy of Germany